PeteStrumentals is the second studio album from hip hop producer/rapper Pete Rock. The album is an Instrumental hip hop album and the second installment of BBE Records Beat Generation series, following Jay Dee's Welcome to Detroit album. The instrumental songs were originally recorded between 1990 and 1995, but were remixed and continued when putting together the album. All songs featuring vocals (The U.N., Freddie Foxxx, C.L. Smooth & Nature) were recorded exclusively for this project between 2000 and 2001.

Background
There are two versions of this album. On the first version, twelve of the fourteen tracks are instrumentals, and the tracks "Cake" and "Nothin' Lesser" both feature rapping from The UN. On the second, five out of sixteen tracks feature vocals from The UN, Freddie Foxxx, Nature, and Rock's former partner, CL Smooth. The updated version of the album was a result of Rock being blown away by Jay Dee's Welcome to Detroit which made him feel he needed to better his own contribution to the Beat Generations series. The 10 year anniversary expanded and limited edition of PeteStrumentals was released on May 10, 2011. Featuring the original 2001 album tracks on disc one. Disc two is a bonus disc featuring all the 12" inch singles from the album, including a remix of "Back on the Block" featuring CL Smooth, a clean version of "Cake" featuring The UN, and a cappella and instrumental versions of "Back on the Block", "Nothin' Lesser", "Mind Frame" & "Give it to Y'all". Along with "Outro" instrumental.

A sequel, PeteStrumentals 2, was released on June 23, 2015. Another sequel by Rock, PeteStrumentals 3 was released on December 11, 2020. The fourth upcoming sequel to Rock's PeteStrumentals series, PeteStrumentals 4 is confirmed as finished and it's scheduled to be released soon. The project was released on March 31, 2022.

Critical reception
A publisher from Sputnikmusic called PeteStrumentals "a musical gem and a definite hip-hop classic, delivering more of the thumping and laid-back grooves that the acclaimed producer is known for. The jazz-laced and soulful production is classic, with easily enjoyable beats that will certainly get you to at least attempt a freestyle or two to the instrumental tracks." Exclaim! wrote "This release is the second in BBE's quickly burgeoning Beat Generation series; unlike the first guest Jay Dee, and as the title suggests, Pete keeps things largely instrumental by only inviting MCs on a couple of tracks."

Track listing

First edition
All tracks produced by Pete Rock

Second edition
All tracks produced by Pete Rock

2011 10th Anniversary Edition

Disc 1
The first disc has the same track listing as the Second Edition.

Disc 2
All tracks produced by Pete Rock

Album singles

Charts

Album

Singles

References

External links
 

2001 albums
Instrumental hip hop albums
Pete Rock albums
Albums produced by Pete Rock
Barely Breaking Even albums
Albums recorded at Greene St. Recording